Seth Tobias (April 8, 1963 – September 4, 2007) was an American hedge fund manager and financial commentator who made frequent appearances on the CNBC television programs Squawk Box and Kudlow & Company.

Early life and education
Tobias was born in Philadelphia, Pennsylvania, on April 8, 1963, and had four brothers, Sam, Spence, Scot and Joshua. He was raised in Plymouth Meeting and graduated from Plymouth-Whitemarsh High School and from Boston University with a B.A. in finance.

Career
He was the president of Circle T Partners, a company he founded in 1996 at age 32 after working for five years as portfolio manager and equity trader at JRO Associates.

Tobias' career began by processing trades for a then-unknown portfolio manager named Jim Cramer, who went on to host "Mad Money." Tobias impressed Cramer, but the job didn't last long. Tobias traded up to a position with the much larger JRO Associates hedge fund. Five years later, Tobias headed out on his own.

Personal life
Tobias' first wife was Tricia Zocchi of South Jersey. At the time of his death, he was married to Filomena Tobias.

Death
Tobias died on September 4, 2007, after drowning in his pool while under the influence of cocaine, alcohol ambien  of a heart attack

References

1963 births
2007 deaths
Deaths by drowning in the United States
American investors
20th-century American Jews
People from Jupiter, Florida
Businesspeople from Philadelphia
People from Montgomery County, Pennsylvania
Boston University School of Management alumni
20th-century American businesspeople
21st-century American Jews
Television personalities from Florida